Irwinia is a genus of flowering plants in the sunflower family.

Species
There is only one known species, Irwinia coronata, native to the State of Bahia in eastern Brazil.

References

Vernonieae
Endemic flora of Brazil